The Civil Aviation Authority of Mongolia (CAA) is the civil aviation agency of Mongolia. Its head office is in Ulaanbaatar.

References

External links

 Civil Aviation Authority of Mongolia
 Civil Aviation Authority of Mongolia 
 Flight Information Region In Mongolia

Government agencies of Mongolia
Mongolia
Civil aviation in Mongolia
Aviation organizations based in Mongolia